Arnold Wilberforce Trowell, also known as Thomas Wilberforce Trowell, (25 June 1887 – 16 December 1966) was a New Zealand composer, cellist and teacher, who became Professor of Music at the Guildhall School of Music in London.

Biography 
Arnold Trowell was born in Wellington, New Zealand in 1887. He was the son of Thomas Trowell and twin of Garnet Carrington Trowell. In 1903 both brothers went to Europe to study; Arnold the cello and Garnet the violin.

Trowell studied at the Hoch Conservatorium in Frankfurt and in Brussels, winning the Concours prize for the cello. He settled in London in 1907.

Before leaving for Europe Trowell had become friends, and romantically involved, with Katherine Mansfield and they continued to correspond when Mansfield was living in London and Trowell was studying in Brussels. Mansfield later fell in love with Garnet.

He became Professor of Cello at the Guildhall School of Music in 1924 and joined the staff of the Royal School of Music from 1937.

Trowell was both performer and composer. He wrote seven concertos, three sonatas, four symphonic poems and numerous pieces for cello and piano and songs.

Like Fritz Kreisler, Trowell forged in 1924 a version of Louis Francœur's cello/violin sonata in E (which is also often misattributed to Francœur's brother, François Francœur). Trowell replaced Francœur's second movement with his own Allegro Vivo movement. There are several recordings of the forgery with this misattribution.

Selected works 

 Six morceaux pour violoncelle avec accomp. de piano (1908) - dedicated to Kathleen M. Beauchamp
 Concerto for violoncelle avec accompagnement d'orchestre (ou piano) (c1909)
 Quartet for two violins, viola and violoncello, G major (c1917)
 Technology of violoncello playing - Books 1–3 (1922–1925)
 Suite for orchestra : the golden age : childhood (c1930)

References

Further reading

 Griffiths, M. (2012). Arnold Trowell - Violoncellist, Composer and Pedagogue (Thesis, Doctor of Philosophy (PhD)). University of Waikato, Hamilton, New Zealand.

External links 

 Formal seated portrait of Arnold Trowell with cello, 1924, on National Library of New Zealand

1887 births
1966 deaths
New Zealand composers
New Zealand classical composers
20th-century classical composers
New Zealand classical cellists
People from Wellington City
20th-century cellists